XHHX-FM is a radio station on 101.7 FM in Ciudad Obregón, Sonora. It is owned by Radio Grupo García de León and is known as La Mía with a grupera format.

History
XEHX-AM received its concession on June 4, 1952. It was owned by Gerardo Millán Ríos, and by the 1960s by María Elena Coral Otero de Chávez due to her divorce with Millan Ríos and operated as a daytimer with 1,000 watts, initially on 1370 kHz and then on 1460. It was sold to Radio Yaqui in 1971, to Sistemas Publicitarios y de Mercadotecnia de Obregón in 1992, and to XEHX, S.A. in 1994. In 2006, XEHX moved from 1460 kHz to 860, still with 1,000 watts.

In October 2011, XEHX was cleared to move to FM as XHHX-FM 101.7.

References

Spanish-language radio stations
Radio stations in Sonora